Valentina Ivakhnenko and Andreea Prisăcariu were the defending champions but Ivakhnenko chose not to participate. Prisăcariu partnered alongside Isabelle Haverlag but lost to Anastasia Dețiuc and Miriam Kolodziejová in the quarterfinals.

Victoria Jiménez Kasintseva and Renata Zarazúa won the title, defeating Alicia Barnett and Olivia Nicholls in the final, 6–4, 2–6, [10–8].

Seeds

Draw

Draw

References
Main Draw

Torneig Internacional de Tennis Femení Solgironès - Doubles